"Life Is But a Dream" is a song recorded by Canadian country music artist Joel Feeney. It was released in 1995 as the sixth single from his second studio album, ...Life Is but a Dream. The song peaked at number 9 on the RPM Country Tracks chart in November 1995.

Chart performance

Year-end charts

References

1993 songs
1995 singles
Joel Feeney songs
MCA Records singles
Songs written by Joel Feeney
Songs written by Chris Farren (country musician)
Song recordings produced by Chris Farren (country musician)